Princess Sun (personal name unknown) was a princess consort of the Chinese Northern Yan dynasty. Her husband was Feng Ba (Emperor Wencheng).

When Feng Ba took the throne in 409 after the death of Gao Yun (Emperor Huiyi), he took the title "Heavenly Prince" (Tian Wang), but whereas most owners of that title during the Sixteen Kingdoms period treated themselves and were treated as emperors in all respects, including creating their wives as empresses, Feng Ba only gave her the title of princess. No further historical reference was made to her, although she was in all likelihood the mother of his daughter Princess Lelang. At the time of Feng Ba's death in 430, his favorite concubine was Consort Song, and nothing was mentioned about Princess Sun.

References 

Northern Yan empresses